The MDB Polysequencer is an eight track polyphonic sequencer manufactured in France and released in 1980.

It was designed by Eric Lamya. The unit could be backed up on cartridges or diskettes.  Each sequence can be entered note by note, or saved with the keyboard that is supplied with the unit.

Notable users
 Jean-Michel Jarre
 Saint Preux

References

Polyphonic synthesizers
Analog synthesizers
Products introduced in 1980